The Manuel Silva Barn near Shoshone, Idaho, United States, was built in 1910 by stonemason Ignacio Berriochoa, who lived about  away.  It was listed on the National Register of Historic Places (NRHP) in 1983.

See also
Arthur D. Silva Water Tank, a work of another local stonemason, NRHP-listed

References

Barns on the National Register of Historic Places in Idaho
Buildings and structures completed in 1910
Buildings and structures in Lincoln County, Idaho
National Register of Historic Places in Lincoln County, Idaho